The 1989 New York Yankees season was the 87th season for the Yankees. The team finished with a record of 74–87, finishing in fifth place, 14.5 games behind the Toronto Blue Jays. New York was managed by Dallas Green and Bucky Dent. The Yankees played at Yankee Stadium.

Offseason
 October 24, 1988: Jack Clark and Pat Clements were traded by the Yankees to the San Diego Padres for Stan Jefferson, Jimmy Jones and Lance McCullers.
 November 17, 1988: Don Schulze was signed as a free agent by the Yankees.
 November 23, 1988: Steve Sax was signed as a free agent by the Yankees.
 November 26, 1988: Steve Kiefer was signed as a free agent by the Yankees.
 December 5, 1988: Bobby Meacham was traded by the New York Yankees to the Texas Rangers for Bob Brower.
 December 8, 1988: Andy Hawkins was signed as a free agent by the Yankees.
 December 18, 1988: Wayne Tolleson was signed as a free agent by the Yankees.
 December 20, 1988: Jamie Quirk was signed as a free agent by the Yankees.
 December 22, 1988: Dickie Noles was signed as a free agent by the Yankees.
 January 10, 1989: Rick Rhoden was traded by the Yankees to the Houston Astros for John Fishel, Mike Hook (minors), and Pedro DeLeon (minors).
 February 13, 1989: Tommy John was signed as a free agent by the Yankees.
 March 19, 1989: Joel Skinner was traded by the Yankees to the Cleveland Indians for Mel Hall.
 March 23, 1989: Charles Hudson was traded by the Yankees to the Detroit Tigers for Tom Brookens.
 March 29, 1989: Dana Ridenour (minors) was traded by the Yankees to the Seattle Mariners for Steve Balboni.

Regular season
 Alvaro Espinoza was second in the majors with 23 sacrifices.
 In 1989, Yankees pitcher Tommy John matched Deacon McGuire's record (since broken) for most seasons played in a Major League Baseball career with 26 seasons played.
Sammy Sosa made his major league debut on June 16, 1989, in a game against the New York Yankees. Sosa appeared in 4 at-bats and had 2 hits.

Season standings

Record vs. opponents

Notable transactions
 April, 30 1989 Al Leiter was traded by the Yankees to the Toronto Blue Jays for Jesse Barfield.
 May 16, 1989: Jamie Quirk was released by the Yankees.
 May 30, 1989: Tommy John was released by the Yankees.
 June 5, 1989: J. T. Snow was drafted by the Yankees in the 5th round of the 1989 Major League Baseball Draft. Player signed June 11, 1989.
 June 21, 1989: Rickey Henderson was traded by the Yankees to the Oakland Athletics for Greg Cadaret, Eric Plunk, and Luis Polonia.
 June 22, 1989: Richard Dotson was released by the Yankees.
 July 20, 1989: Stan Jefferson was traded by the Yankees to the Baltimore Orioles for John Habyan.
 July 22, 1989: Mike Pagliarulo and Don Schulze were traded by the Yankees to the San Diego Padres for Walt Terrell and a player to be named later. The Padres completed the deal by sending Freddie Toliver to the Yankees on September 27.
 August 10, 1989: Rich Gossage was selected off waivers by the Yankees from the San Francisco Giants.
 August 29, 1989: John Candelaria was traded by the Yankees to the Montreal Expos for Mike Blowers.
 August 30, 1989: Ken Phelps was traded by the Yankees to the Oakland Athletics for Scott Holcomb (minors).

Roster

Player stats

Batting

Starters by position
Note: Pos = Position; G = Games played; AB = At bats; H = Hits; Avg. = Batting average; HR = Home runs; RBI = Runs batted in

Other batters
Note: G = Games played; AB = At bats; H = Hits; Avg. = Batting average; HR = Home runs; RBI = Runs batted in

Pitching

Starting pitchers 
Note: G = Games pitched; IP = Innings pitched; W = Wins; L = Losses; ERA = Earned run average; SO = Strikeouts

Other pitchers 
Note: G = Games pitched; IP = Innings pitched; W = Wins; L = Losses; ERA = Earned run average; SO = Strikeouts

Relief pitchers 
Note: G = Games pitched; W = Wins; L = Losses; SV = Saves; ERA = Earned run average; SO = Strikeouts

Farm system 

LEAGUE CHAMPIONS: Albany-Colonie, Prince William, GCL Yankees

References

1989 New York Yankees at Baseball Reference
1989 New York Yankees team page at www.baseball-almanac.com

New York Yankees seasons
New York Yankees
New York Yankees
1980s in the Bronx